Wilt may refer to:

 Wilting, the loss of rigidity of non-woody parts of plants
 WILT, An acronym commonly used in instant messaging for 'What I'm Listening To'
 Wilt disease, which can refer to a number of different diseases in plants.
 wilt, an archaic verb form, see will and shall

In literature and film:
 Wilt (novel), a novel by Tom Sharpe
 Wilt (film), a 1989 adaptation of Sharpe's novel
 Wilt: Larger than Life, a biography of Wilt Chamberlain by Robert Cherry
 Wilt: Just Like Any Other 7-Foot Black Millionaire Who Lives Next Door, an autobiography by Wilt Chamberlain

In other media:
 Wilt (band), an Irish indie rock band formed by ex-members of Kerbdog
 WILT (FM), a radio station (103.7 FM) licensed to serve Wrightsville Beach, North Carolina, United States
 WILT-LD, a low-power television station (channel 33, virtual 24) licensed to serve Wilmington, North Carolina
 WYHW, a radio station (104.5 FM) licensed to serve Wilmington, North Carolina, which held the call sign WILT from 2008 to 2015
 WRMR (FM), a radio station (98.7 FM) licensed to serve Jacksonville, North Carolina, which held the call sign WILT from 2005 to 2008
 "Wilt", a song by Blind Melon from Soup
 Wilt, a fictional character from the animated TV series Foster's Home for Imaginary Friends

People with the given name:
 Wilt Chamberlain, a Hall of Fame American basketball player, born Wilton Chamberlain

People with the surname:
Wilt (surname)

See also
 Wilton (disambiguation)
 Wilts
 Wiltz (disambiguation)